St Anne's House is a grade II listed building in East End Road, East Finchley, London. The house was built in the early nineteenth century with mid century additions.

References 

Finchley
Grade II listed buildings in the London Borough of Barnet